KRGI may refer to:
 
 KRGI (AM), a radio station (1430 AM) licensed to Grand Island, Nebraska, United States
 KRGI-FM, a radio station (96.5 FM) licensed to Grand Island, Nebraska, United States